The Kirkuk–Baniyas pipeline is a crude oil pipeline from the Kirkuk oil field in Iraq to the Syrian port of Baniyas. The pipeline was opened on 23 April 1952. 

Between 1982 and 2000 the pipeline was shout by Iraq, due to Syrian support to Iran during the Iran–Iraq War. 

During the 2003 invasion of Iraq, the pipeline was damaged by U.S. air-strikes and remained out of operation since then.

On 17 December 2007, Syria and Iraq agreed to rehabilitate the pipeline. The pipeline was to be reconstructed by Stroytransgaz, a subsidiary of Gazprom.  However, Stroytransgaz failed to start the rehabilitation and the contract was nullified in April 2009.  As the rehabilitation of the existing pipeline occurred to be more costly than building a new pipeline, in September 2010 Iraq and Syria agreed to build two new Kirkuk–Baniyas pipelines.  One pipeline with capacity of  would carry heavier crude oil while another pipeline capacity of  would carry lighter crude oil.

See also

Kirkuk–Ceyhan Oil Pipeline

References

External links
 The Kirkuk – Baniyas Pipeline

Oil pipelines in Iraq
Oil pipelines in Syria
Iraq–Syria relations